Wuriyanga Mosque is located in the Upper East region of Ghana, beyond Garu. It is located southeast of Bawku.

History 
It was claimed to be built in the 19th century. It was claimed the founders of the mosque of Wuriyanga were Mossi Muslims who migrated from the west around the Bobo-Dioulasso area in Burkina Faso. The kusasis named the place 'widiyang' meaning a female horse but have been corrupted  to woriyanga. The Mossi of the village built their first mosque which was similar to the style of their homeland.

Features 
It is made from mud. It has no exterior buttresses and has only one tower. Like other mosques in Northern and Savannah Regions of Ghana, Wuriyanga Mosque is built in the traditional Djenne architectural style, using local materials and construction techniques. The weight and flat roof of the mosque are supported by very thick load-bearing walls and many columns on the interior. The building is rectangular in shape.

References 

Mosques in Ghana
Upper East Region
19th-century mosques
19th-century establishments in Gold Coast (British colony)
Mossi people
Sudano-Sahelian architecture